Emmanuel Antwi (born 5 May 1996) is a Ghanaian professional footballer who plays as a defender for Příbram.

Club career

Liberty Professionals 
Antwi's senior career began in Ghana with Liberty Professionals. In 2015, Slovácko loaned Antwi. However, he returned to Liberty Professionals months later following zero appearances; though was an unused substitute once, on 2 May for an away fixture to Viktoria Plzeň. After returning to his parent club, he subsequently made three appearances during the 2016 Ghanaian Premier League.

Slavia Prague 
In September 2016, Czech First League side Slavia Prague purchased Antwi. He was soon sent out on loan, joining Sigma Olomouc in the following February. Like with Slovácko, he didn't make a first-team appearance for them.

Příbram 
On 27 August 2017, Antwi signed a contract with Příbram of the Czech National Football League. He made his professional debut for the club on 29 October versus Baník Sokolov, which was the first of fifteen appearances throughout the 2017–18 campaign; a season that ended with promotion.

International career
Antwi represented the Ghana U20 team during 2015. He was selected for the 2015 African U-20 Championship in Senegal, subsequently winning one cap against Mali in the third-place play-off. He was also chosen in Ghana's preliminary squad for the 2015 FIFA U-20 World Cup in New Zealand, but didn't make the final cut.

Career statistics
.

References

External links

1996 births
Living people
Ghanaian footballers
Ghana under-20 international footballers
Association football forwards
Ghanaian expatriate footballers
Expatriate footballers in the Czech Republic
Ghanaian expatriate sportspeople in the Czech Republic
Ghana Premier League players
Czech National Football League players
Czech First League players
Liberty Professionals F.C. players
1. FC Slovácko players
SK Slavia Prague players
SK Sigma Olomouc players
1. FK Příbram players
People from Tamale, Ghana